Streptolabis hispoides is a species of beetle in the family Cerambycidae, the only species in the genus Streptolabis.

Description

Distribution

References

Trachyderini
Monotypic beetle genera